Jenison High School is the senior high school for Jenison Public Schools located in Jenison, Michigan serving grades 9 through 12. The school's athletics department competes in the Ottawa-Kent Conference. At a basketball game on December 16, 2022, students from the Jenison student section were observed making racial taunts and monkey noises at an opposing African-American student-athlete. The Jenison students were reportedly suspended for their conduct.

Academics
Jenison High School offers 18 different Advance Placement (AP) courses.

In 2016 the average SAT composite score for the class of 2017 was 1098.

Athletics

Softball
State Champions, Class A, 1987, 1988, 1990, 1992, 1994, 1995

The softball field is named after Jerry Hoag, head coach of all Jenison's State Championship softball teams.

Football
The team plays in David McKenzie Stadium, which is named after one of the districts former superintendents.

Ice Hockey
The Jenison/Zeeland Varsity hockey team plays their games in Georgetown ice arena.

Baseball
Jenison's teams play at Gary Cook Field.

Notable alumni
 Caleb Baragar, professional baseball pitcher for the San Francisco Giants
 Mark Dewey, MLB player
 Paul Grasmanis, NFL player
Glenn Duffie Shriver

References

External links
 Jenison Public Schools

Public high schools in Michigan
Educational institutions established in 1970
Schools in Ottawa County, Michigan
1970 establishments in Michigan